Juan Pitinari (born 18 January 1995) is an Argentine rugby union player, currently playing for United Rugby Championship side Zebre Parma. His preferred position is prop. 

He made his debut in the same match as a replacement.

In 2018 and 2019, he played for Argentina XV in uncapped tests.

References

1995 births
Living people
Argentine rugby union players
Zebre Parma players
Rugby union props
Sportspeople from Rosario, Santa Fe